Abdul Rahman "Abbe" Khalili (born 7 June 1992) is a Swedish footballer who plays as a central midfielder for Olympiakos Nicosia in the Cypriot First Division.

Club career

Early career and Helsingborgs IF
Born and raised in Helsingborg, Khalili started playing football with local club Högaborgs BK as a youngster. He later moved to Helsingborgs IF and made his debut in Allsvenskan, Sweden's first tier, by making two appearances in 2010.

In 2011, he was loaned to IFK Värnamo in Superettan, the domestic second division. The transfer was made permanent at the end of the season. He stayed for two more years with the club, mostly competing at the bottom half of the table, but left by mutual consent at the end of 2013. In total, Khalili played 40 league games and scored five goals for IFK Värnamo.

Ahead of the 2014 season, Khalili was re-signed by Helsingborgs IF. Under manager Roar Hansen, he had his major breakthrough and established himself as a starter in Allsvenskan, playing 12 games and scoring once during the first half of the season. In the semi-final of the 2013–14 Svenska Cupen, Khalili scored as Helsingborgs IF eliminated local rival Malmö FF through a 2–0 win.

Years in Turkey
In the 2014 summer transfer window, Khalili transferred to Mersin İdman Yurdu in the Turkish Süper Lig on a three-year deal, for a reported fee of around 6 million Swedish kronor. His teammate Loret Sadiku had just completed a similar transfer. Khalili soon became a key player for Mersin İdman Yurdu. In the summer of 2015, he reportedly attracted interest from Spanish club Real Betis and other Turkish sides, but a transfer was not materialised due to a high asking price of around €5 million.

He left Mersin İdman Yurdu by mutual consent after two years. Before the start of the 2016–17 season, Khalili signed with Gençlerbirliği, linking up with compatriot Johannes Hopf, in which the side finished 8th in the table. In 2017–18, Khalili's second season with the club, Gençlerbirliği was relegated from the Süper Lig.

Before the start of the 2018–19 season, Khalili signed with Kasımpaşa on a free transfer. He stayed with the club for one and half year, mostly competing at the bottom half of the Süper Lig table, before leaving by mutual consent in January 2020.

Hammarby IF
On 20 February 2020, he signed a two-year contract with Hammarby IF in Allsvenskan. The season was postponed due to the COVID-19 pandemic, but Khalili established himself as a starter, making 27 league appearances and scoring twice, although his side disappointedly finished 8th in the table. Khalili scored in the first round of the 2020–21 UEFA Europa League against Puskás Akadémia (in a 3–0 win), before the club was eliminated from the tournament in the second round against Lech Poznań (in a 3–0 loss).

Before the start of the 2021 season, Khalili was appointed joint-captain of Hammarby together with Jeppe Andersen, but was later replaced in role by head coach Miloš Milojević. On 30 May 2021, Khalili won the 2020–21 Svenska Cupen, the main domestic cup, with Hammarby through a 5–4 win on penalties (0–0 after full-time) against BK Häcken in the final. The club reached the play-off of the 2021–22 UEFA Europa Conference League, where it was knocked out by Basel (4–4 on aggregate) after a penalty shoot-out, although Khalili scored in the first leg away. In September, Khalili's season was cut short due to a knee injury.

Khalili featured in the final of the 2021–22 Svenska Cupen, in which Hammarby lost by 4–5 on penalties to Malmö FF after the game ended in a 0–0 draw. On 12 July 2022, it was announced that Khalili had departed Hammarby at the expiration of his contract.

Return to Helsingborg
On 11 August 2022, Khalili returned to his former club Helsingborgs IF in Allsvenskan, signing a six month-contract.

International career
Khalili was part of the Sweden under-21 squad which won the 2015 European Championship, although his attempt in the final's penalty shootout was saved by Portugal's José Sá.

He made his full international debut for Sweden on 8 September 2015 in UEFA Euro 2016 qualifier against Austria at Friends Arena that ended in a 4–1 loss.

In 2016, he represented the Sweden Olympic team at the 2016 Summer Olympics in Rio de Janeiro, Brazil.

Personal life
Born in Sweden, Khalili is of Palestinian descent. He is the cousin of fellow professional footballers Imad Khalili and Moustafa Zeidan.

Career statistics

Club

Honours
Helsingborgs IF
 Svenska Cupen: 2010
 Svenska Supercupen: 2011

Hammarby IF
 Svenska Cupen: 2020–21

Sweden U21
UEFA European Under-21 Championship: 2015

References

External links
 
 
 
 

1992 births
Living people
Sportspeople from Helsingborg
Association football midfielders
Swedish footballers
Sweden international footballers
Sweden under-21 international footballers
Sweden youth international footballers
Helsingborgs IF players
IFK Värnamo players
Högaborgs BK players
Mersin İdman Yurdu footballers
Gençlerbirliği S.K. footballers
Kasımpaşa S.K. footballers
Hammarby Fotboll players
Allsvenskan players
Superettan players
Süper Lig players
Swedish expatriate sportspeople in Turkey
Expatriate footballers in Turkey
Swedish people of Palestinian descent
Footballers at the 2016 Summer Olympics
Olympic footballers of Sweden